I Got Blues for Ya is an album by guitarist and singer Michael Falzarano, who is best known as a member of the New Riders of the Purple Sage and, before that, Hot Tuna.  His first album in six years, it features Falzarano and his "extended family" of fellow musicians playing ten original blues rock songs and two covers.  It was released on the Hypnotation Records label, distributed by Woodstock Records, on July 22, 2014.

Recording
On his website, Michael Falzarano wrote that he wanted to get back to his blues roots and make an album that sounded like a late '60s / early '70s blues rock record.  Most of the tracks were recorded without overdubs, and some of them were recorded in one take, "to catch the true energy and spirit of a song."

Critical reception
In Relix, Brian Robbins wrote, "Guitarist/vocalist Michael Falzarano has always brought out the best in the players around him, including stints as Jorma Kaukonen’s wingman in Hot Tuna and his present-day role as psychedelicized rhythm cop in the New Riders. When Falzarano’s name is on the label—as it is for his new solo album I Got Blues for Ya—things aren’t any different. A revolving cast of talent (including Crowmatix’ Professor Louie, Kane Daily and Kerry Kearney) assist Falzarano in bluesy greasiness."

On Fab Radio, Fabrizio Poggi said, "A fantastic album by Michael Falzarano, famous for his work with Hot Tuna and the New Riders of the Purple Sage. Recorded with different combinations of musicians, all excellent, the CD features twelve tracks of electric blues, with nuances of Southern blues, electro-acoustic folk blues, rock 'n' roll, and much more."

Track listing
All songs written by Michael Falzarano, except "Death Don't Have No Mercy" by Reverend Gary Davis and "Let's Work Together" by Wilbert Harrison.
"The Night King Curtis Died" – 4:12
"I Got Blues for Ya" – 5:14
"I Never Think About You" – 5:29
"Snake Box Boogie" – 7:45
"Big Fish" – 3:59
"We Got a Party Going On" – 4:43
"Good Good Lovin'" – 4:06
"Crossroads Avenue" – 6:53
"The Devil's Gone Fishin'" – 4:54
"Death Don't Have No Mercy" – 7:57 – recorded live at Brooklyn Bowl
"Trouble" – 3:34
"Let's Work Together" – 3:25

Personnel
Musicians
Michael Falzarano – guitar, acoustic guitar, vocals
Peter Bennett – bass
Klyph Black – bass
Lisa Bouchelle – backup vocals
Gary Burke – drums
Frank Campbell – bass
Christian Cassan – drums
Frank Celenza – bass
Tom Circosta – acoustic guitar
Vassar Clements – fiddle
Josh Colow – lead guitar
Jason Crosby – fiddle
Kane Daily – lead guitar, slide guitar
Dave Diamond – drums
Harley Fine – Farfisa organ
Jimmy Fleming – mandolin
Ray Grappone – drums
Kerry Kearney – lead guitar, slide guitar
Johnny Markowski – drums
Chris Matheos – bass
Miss Marie – backup vocals, percussion
Barry Mitterhoff – mandolin
Mike Miz – acoustic guitar
Eileen Murphy – drums
Professor Louie – piano, Hammond organ, backup vocals
Pete Sears – piano
John Marshall Smith – organ
Alex P. Suter – backup vocals
Freeman White – keyboards
Charlie Wolfe – harmonica
Production
Produced by Michael Falzarano
Recording: Vicki Bell, Professor Louie, Danny Sheehan, Scarekrow
Mixing: Michael Falzarano, Dan Skye
Mastering: Jon Marshall Smith
Photography: Gina Guarnieri
Design: Kevin Morgan

References

Michael Falzarano albums
2014 albums